NHS Providers is the membership organisation for NHS trusts in England, which takes part in negotiations between the trusts and the Department of Health and provides development support to trust leaders. Until 2011, it was a section of the NHS Confederation.

Claiming 100% of trusts and foundation trusts in England as members, NHS Providers is overseen by a board of 20 trust chiefs. The organisation's chief executive since February 2023 is Julian Hartley and its chair is Sir Ron Kerr, former chief executive of Guy's and St Thomas' NHS Foundation Trust, London.

Steve Barclay spoke at the organisation's 2022 conference, hinting that the NHS would be given more money in the chancellor's Autumn Statement.

See also 

 NHS Confederation – represents organisations that commission and provide NHS services
 NHS Employers – negotiates contracts with healthcare staff

References

External links 
 

Medical and health organisations based in England